The Party of the Chameria was a small, short-lived political party in Greece, which aimed to represent the Cham Albanians in the Greek Parliament. It was created by Ali Dino, a famous cartoonist and MP.

1926 elections

The party took part only in the 1926 general elections, gathering 1,539 votes from the Preveza and Ioannina prefectures. In the subsequent elections, the party did not gain the support of the local Albanian population and Ali Dino ran under Farmer-Labor ticket, gaining only 67 votes in 1932.

See also
Cham Albanians
Party for Justice and Unity
Party for Justice and Integration
Cham issue

References

External links
Mavrogordatos, George Th. Stillborn republic: social coalitions and party strategies in Greece, 1922-1936. University of California Press. California, 1983.

Defunct political parties in Greece
Political parties of minorities in Greece
1920s establishments in Greece
Cham Albanians
Chameria